Patrick Fischer (born September 6, 1975) is a Swiss ice hockey coach and former professional ice hockey forward who played briefly in the National Hockey League (NHL) with the Arizona Coyotes. He predominantly played in his native country in the National League A. He is currently the head coach of the Swiss national team.

Playing career 
Fischer made his professional debut at EV Zug of the Swiss National League A (NLA) during the 1992–93 season. He transferred to fellow NLA side HC Lugano in 1997 and won the Swiss championship with the club in 1999. After two years with Lugano, Fischer moved on to HC Davos, where he played until the end of the 2002–03 campaign. During his Davos stint, he won a Swiss championship in 2002 as well as the Spengler Cup in 2000.

He joined back EV Zug in 2003 and then in 2006–07 took his game to the NHL, joining the Arizona Coyotes. He appeared in his first NHL game on October 5, 2006 against the New York Islanders and played a total of 27 games for the Coyotes. After a short stint at SKA St. Petersburg of the Kontinental Hockey League (KHL) at the beginning of the 2007–08 campaign, Fischer returned to Zug. He retired on May 8, 2009 from professional ice hockey. He was named to EV Zug's Wall of Fame and had his jersey number 21 retired by the club.

Fischer won a total of 183 caps for the Swiss national team and played in the 2002 and 2006 Olympic Games as well as in several World Championships.

Coaching career
He started his coaching career in the youth ranks of HC Lugano and was named assistant coach of the club's NLA team in 2010. He briefly took over as interim head coach in October 2011 after the sacking of Barry Smith. In 2013, he was named Lugano head coach and was relieved of his duties in October 2015 after collecting only 16 points from the 15 opening games of the 2015–16 season.

Serving as assistant coach to Sean Simpson, Fischer helped the Swiss national team win the silver medal at the 2013 World Championships, and also joined the coaching staff for the 2014 World Championships.

In December 2015, he was named head coach of the Swiss national team.

Career statistics

Regular season and playoffs

International

References

External links
 

1975 births
Living people
HC Davos players
EV Zug players
Expatriate ice hockey players in Russia
HC Lugano players
Ice hockey players at the 2002 Winter Olympics
Ice hockey players at the 2006 Winter Olympics
Olympic ice hockey players of Switzerland
People from Zug
Sportspeople from the canton of Zug
Phoenix Coyotes players
San Antonio Rampage players
SKA Saint Petersburg players
Swiss ice hockey centres
Swiss expatriate ice hockey people
Swiss expatriate sportspeople in Russia
Swiss expatriate sportspeople in the United States
Switzerland men's national ice hockey team coaches
Undrafted National Hockey League players
Ice hockey coaches at the 2018 Winter Olympics
Ice hockey coaches at the 2022 Winter Olympics
Expatriate ice hockey players in Canada
Swiss expatriate sportspeople in Canada
Expatriate ice hockey players in the United States